Fridericia may refer to:
 Fridericia (annelid), a genus of annelid worms in the family Enchytraeidae
 Fridericia (plant), a genus of plants in the family Bignoniaceae